Sonja Pannen (born 15 November 1968) is a Dutch softball player. She competed in the women's tournament at the 1996 Summer Olympics.

References

1968 births
Living people
Dutch softball players
Olympic softball players of the Netherlands
Softball players at the 1996 Summer Olympics
Sportspeople from Leiden
20th-century Dutch women